Early Bird is an unincorporated community in Marion County, Florida, United States.

History
Early Bird was located along a now-abandoned  branch of the Florida Central and Peninsular Railroad, constructed in 1891.

A phosphate mine was located in Early Bird, and other mines were located nearby.

Early Bird had a post office in 1893.

By 1915, the mine had been "long ago abandoned".

In 1920, the Melton Timber Company operated a logging railroad and mill in Early Bird.

References

Unincorporated communities in Marion County, Florida
Unincorporated communities in Florida